Gamelan Son of Lion (GSOL) is a new-music American gamelan ensemble based in New York City. The group was founded in 1976 by Barbara Benary (who constructed most of the instruments), Philip Corner, and Daniel Goode. It is a composers' collective as well as repertory ensemble. Current composers in the group in addition to the co-founders are: David Demnitz, Laura Liben, Jody Kruskal, Lisa Karrer, Marnen Laibow-Koser, Jody Diamond, and David Simons.

Gamelan Son of Lion's keyed instruments have bars constructed of iron, in the Javanese style. The group uses both the pelog and slendro tuning systems, sometimes in conjunction with one another within a single composition.

Discography
1979 – Gamelan In The New World (Folkways)
1992 – Macedonian Air Drumming (Bridge) – includes 1 track performed by GSOL
1992 – Interaction: New Music for Gamelan (Leonardo/ISAST) – includes 2 tracks performed by GSOL
1995 – New Gamelan/New York (GSOL Records)
1996 – Gamelan as a Second Language (GSOL)
2002 – Bending the Gending (GSOL)
2004 – The Complete Gamelan in the New World (Locust Music)
2004 – Prismatic Hearing (Tzadik)
2005 – Metal Notes (Locust Music)
2006 – Sun on Snow (New World)
2007 – Dragon Toes (GSOL)
2008 – Sonogram (Innova)
2009 – Fung Sha Noon (Tzadik)

References

 Facts Become Sounds. The Village Voice. November 27, 1978.
 Music in Review; Gamelan Son of Lion – The New York Times. May 4, 1991.
 New York Music – Rock Happens. The Village Voice. November 29, 2005.

External links
 Gamelan Son of Lion website

Son of Lion
Contemporary classical music ensembles
Musical groups established in 1976
Musical groups from New York City
1976 establishments in New York City